Pepsi Wild Cherry is a cherry-flavored cola first introduced in 1988 by PepsiCo. Two sugar-free versions are also available, with zero calories, named Diet Pepsi Wild Cherry and Pepsi Zero Sugar Wild Cherry, and a vanilla-flavored version Pepsi Cherry Vanilla is also available. Alongside the beverages, a lip balm version is also available. Pepsi Wild Cherry is currently sold in the United States and Canada as a regular, permanent product.

History

In response to the successful launch of Cherry Coke in 1985, Pepsi extensively test-marketed a formulation simply called "Cherry Pepsi" in Canada from 1985 to 1987. In the U.S., Cherry Cola Slice was introduced as part of the line in 1986 and was offered until the launch of Pepsi Wild Cherry.

Availability
Pepsi Wild Cherry is available nationally in the United States and Canada. In the United States, it is available in 12-ounce (355mL) cans, 24-ounce (710mL) cans, 16.9-ounce (499mL) bottles, 20-ounce (591mL) bottles, 1-liter bottles, and 2-liter bottles. It is also available in the Netherlands and the Czech Republic in some stores. On March 25, 2017, after five years of limited time availability, Pepsi officially relaunched Pepsi Wild Cherry as a permanent Canadian flavour, in 591mL bottles and 12-packs of 355mL cans. Pepsi Max Cherry is available in the United Kingdom, Finland and Germany. It is also available in Israel, under the name Pepsi Max Wild Cherry. It is similar to Diet Pepsi Wild Cherry, but it is branded with a different name.

Branding

Prior to 2005, the product was known as Wild Cherry Pepsi. The re-branding came about due to a change in formula used with a slightly altered taste. 

The logo was slightly changed in 2007, as the "Pepsi" script, in the case of Pepsi Wild Cherry, was slightly moved up above the globe. This design, however, was only found on the boxes that carried cans, 1-, and 2-liter bottles, as the 20-ounce bottles and 12-ounce cans still carried the original 2005 design.

In October 2008, Pepsi announced they would be redesigning its logo and re-branding many of its products by early 2009. In 2009, Pepsi, Diet Pepsi and Pepsi Max began using all lower-case fonts for name brands. The brand's blue and red globe trademark became a series of "smiles," with the central white band arcing at different angles depending on the product. In the case of Pepsi, the logo has the medium-sized "smile", while the new lower-case font is used. In March 2010, Pepsi Wild Cherry received the redesign on bottles and cans. Beginning in March 2013, the drink came to the United Kingdom with plans to expand it worldwide. Also in late 2013 and in some areas in early 2014, the packaging was redesigned again, now resembling the 2005-2010 design and the blue coloring on the bottles and cans were made lighter.

Ingredients/nutrition

Pepsi Wild Cherry
Carbonated water, high fructose corn syrup and/or sugar, caramel color, phosphoric acid, natural flavors, caffeine and citric acid.

All Values per 8 fl. oz: Calories: 110, Total Fat (g): 0, Sodium (mg): 25, Potassium (mg): 5, Total Carbohydrates (g): 29, Sugars (g): 29, Protein (g): 0, Caffeine (mg): 25

Pepsi Wild Cherry (Canada)
Carbonated water, glucose-fructose, caramel colour, sugar, natural cherry flavours, phosphoric acid, caffeine and citric acid.

per 355mL: Calories: 150, Total Fat 0g, Sodium 15 mg, Carbohydrate/glucides 41g, Sugars 41g, Protein 0g

Diet Pepsi Wild Cherry
Carbonated water, caramel color, natural flavor, phosphoric acid, potassium citrate, sucralose, citric acid, acesulfame potassium, caffeine, potassium sorbate (preserves freshness), Calcium disodium EDTA (to protect flavor)

All Values per 8 fl.oz Calories 0 Total Fat (g) 0 Sodium (mg) 25 Potassium (mg) 37 Total Carbohydrates (g) 0 Sugars (g) 0 Protein (g) 0 Caffeine (mg) 25

Pepsi Zero Sugar Wild Cherry
Carbonated water, caramel color, natural flavor, phosphoric acid, potassium citrate, sucralose, citric acid, acesulfame potassium, caffeine, potassium sorbate (preserves freshness), calcium disodium edta (to protect flavor)

All Values per 8 fl.oz Calories 0 Total Fat (g) 0 Sodium (mg) 25 Potassium (mg) 37 Total Carbohydrates (g) 0 Sugars (g) 0 Protein (g) 0 Caffeine (mg) 25

References

External links
Pepsi Product Information - Pepsi Wild Cherry
Pepsi Product Information - Diet Pepsi Wild Cherry

PepsiCo soft drinks
Cherry colas
Products introduced in 1988
Caffeinated soft drinks